This is a list of people from Wigan, in North West England. The demonym of Wigan is Wiganer; however, this list may include people from the wider Metropolitan Borough of Wigan—from Ashton-in-Makerfield, Hindley, Ince-in-Makerfield, Atherton, Leigh, Tyldesley, and other areas in the borough. This list is arranged alphabetically by surname:



A
Andy Ainscow (born 1968), former footballer
James Anderton, former Chief Constable of Greater Manchester Police
Richard Ashcroft, lead singer of The Verve, born in Billinge 
Chris Ashton, England rugby league and rugby union international, born in Wigan
Bill Ashurst, rugby league footballer of the 1960s and 1970s for Great Britain, Lancashire, Wigan, Penrith Panthers, Wakefield Trinity, and Runcorn Highfield, born in Wigan

B
Alan R. Battersby, (born 1925) is a FRS and organic chemist known for his work on the genetic blueprint, structure, and synthetic pathway of Cyanocobalamin.
Tom Billington, professional wrestler under the ring name 'Dynamite Kid', one half of tag-team 'The British Bulldogs' with Davey Boy Smith, born in Golborne
Margery Booth, opera singer and World War II spy, born in Wigan
Thomas Burke, international operatic tenor; born in Leigh in 1890 and attended St Joseph's School in Leigh; the Leigh Wetherspoon's pub is named after him
Kay Burley, presenter and newsreader on Sky News, born in Wigan
James Burton, built several early cotton mills in Hindsford and Tyldesley, born in Clitheroe

C
Duncan Cleworth, born in Leigh and a member of Tyldesley Swimming Club competed in the 1976 Summer Olympics in Montreal.

D
Kathleen Mary Drew-Baker (19011957), psychologist, born in Leigh
Kathryn Drysdale, actress

E 
Edith Edmonds, artist
Shaun Edwards, rugby league player and coach of London Wasps rugby union coach; Wales national rugby union team defence coach
Greg Ellis, actor and voiceover artist
Edward Entwistle, driver of Stephenson's Rocket

F
Georgie Fame, real name Clive Powell, R&B singer and keyboard player, born in Leigh
Joseph Farington (17471821), watercolour artist, diarist and Royal Academician was born in Leigh where his father was the vicar.
Andrew Farrell, former international rugby player of both codes, born and raised in Wigan and current head coach of the Ireland rugby union team
Brian Finch, Wigan-born script-writer who contributed 151 episodes of Coronation Street over a period of 12 years
John Finch (Singer) Winner of Granada Tv programme " Stars in their eyes in 1994 as Marti Pellow.</ref>
Henry Finch (16331704), Presbyterian minister ejected from Church of England, born in Standish
George Formby, Jr., comedian, ukulele player and actor

Joe Gormley, former president of the National Union of Mineworkers
Andy Gregory, former Wigan rugby league player, born in Ince in Makerfield, now lives in Ashton in Makerfield.
Mike Gregory, former Great Britain national rugby league team and Warrington Wolves captain, former Wigan Warriors coach, born in Wigan
John Elisha Grimshaw, recipient of the Victoria Cross, of "6 VCs before breakfast" fame

H
Roger Hampson (19251996), artist, printmaker and teacher, born in Tyldesley
Keith Harris OBE, music industry consultant & artist manager (Stevie Wonder), former chair of UK Music's Diversity & Equality Taskforce, grew up in Wigan.
Thomas Highs (17181803), inventor of cotton spinning machinery, born in Leigh
James Hilton, author of Goodbye, Mr Chips, born in Leigh
Arthur John Hope (18751960), architect and partner in Bradshaw Gass & Hope, was born and lived in Atherton

I
James Lawrence Isherwood, prolific impressionist/expressionist painter
Robert Isherwood, born in Tyldesley in 1845, was the local miners' agent and treasurer of the Lancashire and Cheshire Miners' Federation between 1881 and his death in1905.

K
Shaun Keaveny, born in Leigh, broadcast his BBC 6 Music breakfast show live from Leigh Library on 11 February 2011
 Thomas Kershaw (18191898), pioneer in creating imitation marble, born in Standish
Roy Kinnear (19341988), comedy actor, born in Wigan
 Victoria Knowles (born 1976), author of bestselling book The PA

L
Eric Roberts Laithwaite (19211997), engineer, known for his development of the linear induction motor and Maglev rail system
John Lennard-Jones (18941954), born in Leigh and attended Leigh Grammar School. He was a physicist and Fellow of the Royal Society. 
Limahl, real name Christopher Hamill, pop rock/dance vocalist, lead singer of Kajagoogoo
James Lindsay, 24th Earl of Crawford (17831869), Earl of Balcarres, built Haigh Hall
Luke Lowe (1889?), Wigan-born football player. He briefly played in the Football League Second Division.

M
Paul Mason (born 1960), journalist and broadcaster, born in Leigh.
Jennifer Moss (1942-2006), actress best known for playing Lucille Hewitt in Coronation Street.

N
Walter Napier (1875?), English professional footballer
Fred Norris (19212006) who worked underground at Cleworth Hall Colliery in Tyldesley competed in the 1952 Helsinki and 1956 Melbourne Olympics.

O
Edward Ormerod, mining engineer at Gibfield Colliery; invented the Ormerod detaching hook, an important mining safety device

P
Mary Pownall (18621937), sculptor, was the daughter of James Pownall the silk manufacturer. She was born and raised in Leigh. 
James Caldwell Prestwich (18521940), architect, born in Atherton, who designed many of Leigh's buildings including the town hall.

R
Frank Randle, comedian, born in Aspull
Ted Ray, comedian
John Roby, folklorist

S
Pete Shelley (19552018), born Peter Campbell McNeish in Leigh, singer, songwriter and guitarist with the Buzzcocks.
Nigel Short, chess grandmaster, grew up in Atherton and attended St Philip's School
Davey Boy Smith, professional wrestler for the WWF and WCW as The British Bulldog
Danny Sonner, Wigan-born association football player who has represented Northern Ireland national football team
John Stopford, Baron Stopford of Fallowfield, FRS, physician and anatomist, Vice-Chancellor of the University of Manchester

T
 George Taylor, born in Wigan, footballer
 Georgia Taylor, actress best known for playing Toyah Battersby in Coronation Street
 Addin Tyldesley who was born in Tyldesley and a member of the town's swimming and water polo club, competed in the 1908 Summer Olympics in London. 
Elizabeth Tyldesley, (15851654) the daughter of Thomas Tyldesley of Morleys Hall, Astley, was a 17th-century abbess at the Poor Clare Convent at Gravelines.
Thomas Tyldesley, died in the Battle of Wigan Lane

W
Charles Walmesley (17221797), Roman Catholic Titular Bishop of Rama; born in Langtree
Dave Whelan, businessman nicknamed "Mr Wigan", founder of JJB Sports, former owner of Wigan Athletic, and former owner of Wigan Warriors
Danny Wilson, Wigan-born association football player and manager
Gerrard Winstanley, founder of the 17th-century Diggers, born in Wigan.
James Wood (16721759), Presbyterian minister of the first Atherton and Chowbent Chapels, led a force that successfully defended the bridge over the River Ribble at Walton le Dale in the Battle of Preston in 1715.
Thomas Woodcock, recipient of the Victoria Cross, born in Wigan
Caleb Wright (18101898), Member of Parliament and mill owner who built Barnfield Mills in Tyldesley

See also
Hacker T. Dog, fictional dog from Wigan
List of people from Greater Manchester

References

Bibliography

 
Wiganers
Wigan